The Miramichi Timberwolves are a Junior "A" hockey team based in Miramichi, New Brunswick.  They play in the Maritime Junior A Hockey League. The team was founded in 2000 and plays their home games at the Miramichi Civic Centre.

History 
The Miramichi Timberwolves joined the Maritime Junior A Hockey League in 2000 and did not enjoy regular season success for three seasons. After the third season they acquired former NHLer Bill Riley as head coach, and the team reached third overall in the league and headed to their first post season.

The first playoff series ever for the Timberwolves was against the Charlottetown Abbies. The "T-wolves", (as they are known to fans) swept the Abbies four games to none. The Timberwolves progressed to the division finals but lost to the Campbellton Tigers in six games.

The Timberwolves have never won a Maritime Junior A Championship. They have reached the league final once and the division finals three times. Playoff disappointments have pushed the Timberwolves to do better in the regular season where in 2007–08 they put together their best to date. Finishing with 42 wins and 87 points good for first in the Meek division, the third time they had won the division in five years.

After another playoff disappointment behind them the T-Wolves started the 2008–2009 season looking to take the next step and win the Kent Cup. They finished second in the Meek Division, five points behind first place Summerside and just one point ahead of third place Woodstock. In the first round the T-Wolves and the Slammers showed why they were so close in the standings. The series went seven games, the first seven-game series that the Timberwolves had ever been a part of in their nine years in the league. The T-Wolves came out on top winning the deciding game 3-2 thanks to Andrew White, who scored all three of the Timberwolves goals. Miramichi moved on to face Summerside in the division final. Summerside was riding high having just swept the Dieppe Commandos, and they swept the series on their way to winning the Kent Cup, making it the second straight season that the Timberwolves were beaten in the Meek Division final (the previous year they were defeated by the Woodstock Slammers in six games.)

The Wolves reached the Kent Cup final during the 2016–17 season, their best in franchise history. They lost to the Truro Bearcats in seven games.

Season-by-season record

See also 
 List of ice hockey teams in New Brunswick
 Maritime Junior A Hockey League
 Timberwolves Webpage

References 

Maritime Junior Hockey League teams
Ice hockey teams in New Brunswick
Sport in Miramichi, New Brunswick